Andru Peytha Mazhaiyil is a 1989 Indian Tamil-language film directed and photographed by Ashok Kumar. The film stars Sarath Babu, Silk Smitha and Saranya. It is a remake of the 1987 American film Fatal Attraction.

Plot 
Rajesh is a happy family man living with his wife Preethi and his daughter Abhi. His friend is Vinodh. He meets Capri (Silk Smitha) by chance. Preethi's mother falls sick and she starts to her home town. On a rainy evening, he mets Capri and starts an steamy affair by chance. She starts haunting him and makes him worried. Preethi senses something weird and suggests a long holiday. They enjoy their trip, while Capri searches for him. All her attempts go in vain. Rajesh asks her to forget him, but she announces her pregnancy. He is shocked and refuses to accept the child. Rajesh's friend suggest to him to go away far from the city so that he could live in peace. Capri has a bad past. She was married and got pregnant, but lost her husband and unborn child in an accident. She becomes mentally ill and since, she wants to keep Rajesh with her forever. She follows Rajesh and finds his new house. Rajesh and family leave for a party to Vinodh's house. Capri kills the rabbit in Rajesh's house and places it in a pressure cooker. He tells his wife about the affair. Preethi calls Capri and warns her not to disturb her family. The next day their daughter goes missing. Capri takes Abi to a park. Preethi gets hit by a car during the search. Rajesh gets violent and tries to kill her. He seeks the help of police to save him from this issue. After a day, Assistant commissioner warns him to be safe as Capri goes missing. She comes in search of Preethi and tries to kill her. Rajesh fights with Capri, meanwhile, Preethi shoots Capri to save Rajesh. The court releases Preethi as she had shot Capri for self-defense. The movie ends on a happy note.

Cast 
Sarath Babu as Rajesh
Silk Smitha as Capri
Saranya as Preethi
Y. G. Mahendran as Vinodh
Charuhasan

Soundtrack 
The soundtrack was composed by Thayanban.

Reception 
The Indian Express wrote, "Ashok Kumar exploited the twilight world between fact and fantasy pertaining to sex [..] and in Andru Peytha Mazhayil he uses from every weapon in his armoury to heighten the play-of-passion effect".

References

External links 
 

1980s Tamil-language films
1989 films
Indian remakes of American films